The Akwesasne Wolves are a Junior ice hockey team in Kawehno:ke District, Akwesasne (Cornwall Island, Ontario).  They played in the Eastern Ontario Junior Hockey League until the end of the 2014-15 season.

History
At the conclusion of the 2014-15 season the league announced it was re-organizing to be more of feeder league to the Central Canada Hockey League and renamed the league Central Canada Hockey League Tier 2.  Originally the Eastern Ontario Junior Hockey league was to reduce to twelve teams, however it was only reduced to 16 teams, eliminating 6 of the current franchises, including the Wolves, Morrisburg Lions, Almonte Thunder, Gananoque Islanders, Gatineau Mustangs and Shawville Pontiacs.

Season-by-season results

External links
Wolves Webpage
EOJHL Webpage

Akwesasne
Eastern Ontario Junior B Hockey League teams
Ice hockey clubs established in 1998
1998 establishments in Ontario
Sport in Cornwall, Ontario